Patriarch Stephen of Antioch may refer to:

 Patriarch Stephen I of Antioch, ruled in 341–345 or in 342–344
 Patriarch Stephen II of Antioch, ruled in 477–479